A Canadian passport is the passport issued to citizens of Canada. It enables the bearer to enter or re-enter Canada freely; travel to and from other countries in accordance with visa requirements; facilitates the process of securing assistance from Canadian consular officials abroad, if necessary; and requests protection for the bearer while abroad.

All Canadian passports are issued through the Passport Program of Immigration, Refugees and Citizenship Canada (IRCC). Prior to 1 July 2013, Canadian passports were issued through Passport Canada, an independent operating agency of Foreign Affairs and International Trade Canada. Passports are normally valid for five or ten years for persons 16 years of age and older, and five years for children under 16. In 2022, 70% of Canadians had passports, with over 24.6 million passports in circulation. Although held by individual citizens, all Canadian passports legally remain the property of the Crown and must be returned to the Passport Program upon request.

Canada is a member of the Five Nations Passport Group, an international forum for cooperation between the passport issuing authorities of Canada, Australia, New Zealand, the United Kingdom, and the United States in order to "share best practices and discuss innovations related to the development of passport policies, products and practices."

Canada began issuing biometric passports, also known as electronic passports or e-passports, to Canadian citizens on 1 July 2013.

The Canadian passport ranks fourth in the world in terms of freedom of movement and travel according to the Passport Index.

History
The first Canadian passports were issued in 1862 following the outbreak of the American Civil War, when the United States demanded more secure identification from Canadians wishing to cross the border. They took the form of a "Letter of Request" from the Governor General of Canada. These documents remained in use until 1915, when Canadian passports were first issued in the British format, a ten-section single-sheet folder.

The modern form of the Canadian passport came about in 1921. At that time, Canadians were British subjects, and Canada shared a common nationality with the United Kingdom; thus, Canadian passports were issued to those British subjects resident in or connected to Canada. This arrangement ended in 1947, when the Canadian Citizenship Act was granted Royal Assent and the designation of Canadian citizenship was created. Beginning in July the following year, Canadian passports were issued to Canadian citizens only. However, the first page of Canadian Passports still declared that "A Canadian Citizen is a British Subject," as such was a main clause of the Citizenship Act 1946. This would remain until the Act was overhauled and replaced by the Citizenship Act 1976, after which the phrase on the first page of Canadian Passports was changed to read: "The bearer of this passport is a Canadian citizen."

Between 1947 and 1970, Canadian citizens could only apply for passports by mail to Ottawa. Requirements were simple, and applicants claiming birth in Canada did not have to provide proof of birth. The lax security led to numerous cases of misuse of the passport, so the Canadian Government tightened the application requirements from 1970. That year, the first three Passport Canada offices were opened in Montreal, Toronto, and Vancouver.

The size dimensions of a closed Canadian passport were originally much larger. This changed in the early 1980s in the lead up to the introduction of Machine-Readable Passports (MRP) when the smaller sized booklet was first introduced.

In 1985, the first version of MRPs was issued, in accordance with International Civil Aviation Organization standards. An amended version came into circulation in 1991, with additional security features and more stringent processing requirements. By 1993, a newer version of MRP was introduced, which contained unique features to prevent replication or alteration.

Since 11 December 2001, children have not been included in parents' passports, and passports have been issued for one person only.

In 2002, Passport Canada began to issue an updated version within Canada, which includes the digitally printed photo of the bearer embedded into the identification page of the booklet, holographic images, bar-coded serial number, and a second hidden photo of the bearer that could only be viewed under ultraviolet light. Canadian diplomatic missions abroad adopted this version in 2006. In March 2010, the passport was upgraded to include a new design of the identification page and more anti-counterfeit elements, such as the new colours of Optically Variable Ink and addition of laser perforated number. The cover, watermark, personalisation technique and holographic laminate are same with the 2002 version. The 2010 version was also the last revision of MRP prior to the release of e-passports.

In the 2008 federal budget, Jim Flaherty, Minister of Finance, announced that biometric passports (or "e-passports") would be introduced by 2011. A pilot project began in 2009, with e-passports being issued to special and diplomatic passport applicants. The e-passport roll-out was pushed back to 1 July 2013. On the same day, the issuing authority of Canadian passports was shifted from Foreign Affairs and International Trade Canada to Citizenship and Immigration Canada (CIC), now known as IRCC.

Application and issuance

The issuance of passports falls under the Royal Prerogative. They are issued, in the name of the reigning Canadian monarch (as expressed in the passport note), according to the Canadian Passport Order. This Order in Council specifies grounds for which Immigration, Refugees and Citizenship Canada (IRCC) can issue or renew a passport.

Passport requirements
Under the Canadian Charter of Rights and Freedoms, all Canadian citizens have the right to enter Canada. Since 10 November 2016, under the new visa regulations all visa-free passport holders (except for U.S. citizens and nationals) are required to apply for an Electronic Travel Authorization (eTA) before boarding a flight to Canada. This means there is now a de facto requirement for Canadian citizens to use a Canadian passport when travelling to or transiting through Canada by air, unless a special authorization is obtained within 10 days of travel.

As the eTA is used for the sole purpose of immigration screening for non-Canadian visitors entering Canada on a temporary basis, all Canadian citizens are automatically barred from applying the eTA. Hence the passport requirement is in place, because a Canadian citizen who travels on a visa-free, non-Canadian passport will be prevented from boarding the commercial flight to Canada unless he or she can present a valid Canadian passport during check-in. The only exceptions to this rule are for a Canadian citizen travelling on a U.S. passport, as Americans do not need an eTA to enter Canada, or when a Canadian citizen travelling on an eTA-required passport enters Canada by sea, through one of the land ports of entry from the U.S., or holds a special authorization  (which is free and available to anyone who has previously held a Canadian passport or Canadian citizenship certificate).

Application
Canadians in Canada can submit their applications in person through a passport office, a Service Canada location, or can submit their applications by mail. Canadians in the U.S. or Bermuda can apply only by mail. Canadians living in other countries or territories are required to apply through the nearest Canadian diplomatic posts abroad. Expedited services (urgent, express and standard pick-ups) are only available through a passport office in Canada.

Guarantor of identity
The Canadian passport issuing system is modelled after the United Kingdom, where all first-time passport applications are required to be "countersigned" by a person who has known the applicant for a minimum of 2 years. Australia and New Zealand have similar policies. The use of a guarantor is to serve "as a security measure in the entitlement process and as a point of departure for the future investigation of statements made on the application form".

Rules regarding the eligibility of guarantors were last updated on 12 August 2013. For passport applicants in Canada, only a Canadian passport holder can be a guarantor. For Canadian citizens living abroad who do not have a Canadian guarantor, a non-Canadian guarantor who works in a licensed profession may be used for application, such as a dentist, medical doctor, judge, lawyer, notary public, pharmacist, police officer, veterinarian, or sitting officer for a financial institution.

Passport fees

The fee (since 1 July 2013) for a standard adult passport issued in Canada is $120 for a five-year passport or $160 for a ten-year passport, and outside of Canada is $190 and $260 respectively. The fee for a five-year passport for a child under 16 is $57 if issued in Canada, and $100 outside of Canada. Additional fees are levied for urgent service or replacement of a lost or stolen passport. All fees are payable in Canadian dollars.

Refusal and revocation of passports
IRCC may revoke a passport or refuse to issue or renew a passport on grounds set out in the Canadian Passport Order, including such grounds as failure to submit a complete application, misrepresentation in obtaining a passport, and criminality. However, whether a Canadian passport may be revoked or refused on the basis of national security concerns has been questioned.

Types of passports
Before 1947, there were two types of passports: those issued to people who were born British subjects (navy blue cover) and those issued to people naturalised as British subjects (red cover).

Today, there are five types of Canadian passports:

Regular Passport (navy blue cover) These documents are issued to citizens for occasional travel, such as vacations and business trips.  They contain 36 pages (29 pages available for visa labels and stamps). They can be issued to adults (age 16 years and older) with a validity of 5 or 10 years or children under 16 with a validity of 5 years.

Temporary Passport (white cover)
 These are issued to Canadian citizens outside Canada who require passports but their regular passport application is being processed. This passport contains 8 pages and is valid between six months and one year.

Emergency Travel Document (single page)
 Emergency travel documents are one-use documents issued to Canadians for direct return to their home country, or to the nearest Canadian diplomatic mission where full passport services are offered. The document contains details of the person, photo, travel details and expiry date of the document.

Special Passport (green cover)These are issued pursuant to the Diplomatic and Special Passports Order to people representing the Canadian government on official business, including Privy Councillors, Members of Parliament, provincial cabinet members, public servants, citizens nominated as official non-diplomatic delegates and Canadian Forces members who are posted abroad. Since January 2009 special passports have been issued as electronic passports, in preparation of the full implementation of the ePassport program.

Diplomatic Passport (maroon cover)These are issued pursuant to the Diplomatic and Special Passports Order to Canadian diplomats, high-ranking government officials (including lieutenant governors and commissioners of territories), diplomatic couriers, and private citizens nominated as official diplomatic delegates. Immediate family members of the aforementioned individuals (except diplomatic couriers) who reside with them may be also issued diplomatic passports. Since 2009, diplomatic passports have been issued as electronic passports, in preparation of the full implementation of the ePassport program.  Per the Diplomatic and Special Passports Order, only the Governor General and Prime Minister and their immediate family members may use their diplomatic passports for all types of travel (i.e. official or personal).

Physical appearance
Regular passports are deep navy blue, with the Royal Coat of Arms of Canada emblazoned in the centre of the front cover. The words "PASSPORT•" and the international e-passport symbol are inscribed below the coat of arms, and "CANADA" above. The bilingual cover is indicative of the textual portions of Canadian passports being printed in both English and French, Canada's two official languages. The standard passport contains 36 pages, with 29 available for entry/exit stamps and visas. The size dimensions of a closed Canadian passport are 8.89 cm (3.5") by 12.7 cm (5").

New security features, similar to those on banknotes, have been added with increasing frequency since 2001. Microprinting, holographic images, UV-visible imaging, watermarks and other details have been implemented, particularly on the photo page. As well, the photo is now digitally printed directly on the paper (in both standard and UV-reactive ink); previously, the actual photo had been laminated inside the document.

Data page
 Photo of the passport holder
 Type (Type): P
 Issuing Country (Pays émetteur): listed as "CAN" for "Canada"
 Passport No. (Nº de passeport): 2 letters and 6 numbers
 Surname (Nom)
 Given Names (Prénoms)
 Nationality (Nationalité): Canadian nationality marked as "Canadian/Canadienne" in both English and French
 Date of Birth (Date de naissance)
 Sex (Sexe): "F" for female, "M" for male, "X" for another gender
 Place of Birth (Lieu de naissance): the city and three-letter country code are listed, even if born inside Canada
 Note: Province or State is required on the application form, if applicable, but is not listed in the passport.
 Date of Issue (Date de délivrance)
 Issuing Authority (Autorité de délivrance)
 Date of Expiry (Date d'expiration)

The information page ends with the Machine Readable Zone.

Signature
From 2002 until May 2015, all Canadian passports contained two signature spaces: one is on the data page where a scanned signature is printed along with other personal details, the other is a blank signature block on page 3. After the applicants have received the passport, those over 16 must also sign in the signature block in ink.

Since May 2015, the passport bearer's scanned signature has not been printed on the data page. Adult applicants, however, must still sign page 3 in the passport book when they receive it.

Sex
On 24 August 2017 the Canadian government announced that it would implement procedures for Canadians who wish to have their sex given as X (unspecified) on Canadian passports, which is one of the three permitted sex designations for machine-readable passports along with M (male) and F (female) specified by the International Civil Aviation Organization. As an interim measure until IRCC became able to print passports with X sex designations, effective 31 August 2017 IRCC offered passports with a note on the Observations page indicating that the passport holder should be identified as X rather than the printed sex designation on the data page. Since 11 July 2019, the X designation has been printed on the data page, although travellers are warned that other countries may insist on a male or female designation.

Passport note 

The passports contain a note from the issuing authority addressed to the authorities of all other states, identifying the bearer as a citizen of that state and requesting that they be allowed to pass and be treated according to international norms. The textual portions of Canadian passports are printed in English and French, the official languages of Canada. The note inside of Canadian passports states, in English:

The Minister of Foreign Affairs of Canada requests, in the name of Her Majesty the Queen, all those whom it may concern to allow the bearer to pass freely, without delay or hindrance, and to afford the bearer such assistance and protection as may be necessary.

And in French:

Following the accession of King Charles III, the request will read the following in English:

The Minister of Foreign Affairs of Canada requests, in the name of His Majesty the King, all those whom it may concern to allow the bearer to pass freely, without delay or hindrance, and to afford the bearer such assistance and protection as may be necessary.

And in French:

Place of birth
The place of birth is inscribed under the following format: CITYNAME UTO, where "UTO" is the ISO 3166-1 alpha-3 country code of the country of birth. The first-level administrative country subdivision of birth, such as the Canadian province (or the U.S. state), is not mentioned as a part of place of birth.  So Canadian citizens born in Richmond, British Columbia; Richmond, Quebec; or Richmond, Nova Scotia would have the same inscription as place of birth, RICHMOND CAN (a naturalized Canadian citizen born in Portland, Maine or Portland, Oregon would have PORTLAND USA). Exceptions to this format are listed below.

A passport applicant may request, in writing, that IRCC not list the place of birth (city and country)—or country of birth—on their data page, by filling out PPTC 077. The applicant must indicate his or her awareness that omitting this information could cause difficulties at international entry points or when applying for visas.

Hong Kong, Macau, and Taiwan
In response to the Chinese government's modification of requirements for the issuance of visas to Canadian citizens born in Hong Kong, Macau or Taiwan, Canadian passports issued to Canadians born in Hong Kong, Macau or Taiwan are now issued only with the place of birth and not the three-letter country code. Chinese visas will no longer be issued to Canadian passport holders whose place of birth is inscribed as Hong Kong HKG, Macau MAC, or TWN.

Jerusalem and Palestine
Since April 1976, the policy has been that Canadian citizens born in Jerusalem have their birthplace identified only by the city's name, with no national designation, due to the unresolved legal status of Jerusalem. However, Canadian citizens born prior to 14 May 1948 may have their birthplace identified as Palestine if they were born in what was the British Mandate of Palestine (including Jerusalem).

Changes

Official languages
In September 2003, Le Devoir printed a letter calling on Passport Canada to give individual Canadians the choice of which official language appeared first in their passports, English or French. The Passport Office claimed that this was not allowed under international norms, but it was shown that Belgian passport applications asked Belgian citizens which of their country's three official languages (Dutch, French or German) should appear first in their passports.

ePassport
In 2008, Passport Canada announced that it would be issuing electronic passports to Canadian travellers starting in 2012. The e-passport will have an electronic chip encoded with the bearer's name, gender, and date and place of birth and a digital portrait of their face.

On 7 April 2010, Passport Canada announced that in 2012, Canada will begin issuing electronic passports, or ePassports, to all its citizens. Passport Canada states that "the use of ePassports will allow Canada to follow international standards in the field of passport security to protect the nation's borders and maintain the ease of international travel that Canadians currently enjoy. At the same time, Passport Canada will start offering the option of a 10-year validity period as well as the current 5-year validity period."

In September 2011, Passport Canada announced that the electronic passport would be ready by the end of 2012, however this was pushed back to 2013 when the organisation found significant delay because of an increase in passport applications for revised entry policies to the United States in the late 2000s and a lengthy consultation process was needed to survey public reactions to the new passport changes.

All Canadian passports issued on or after 1 July 2013 have been ePassports.

All ePassports are issued with 36 pages as opposed to the previous choice of 24 or 48 pages.

Proposed online application process
In 2015, IRCC (then known as CIC) planned to modify the passport renewal system by integrating the passport issuance platform with its Global Case Management System (GCMS), a consolidated IT system for citizenship and immigration applications. Under the proposed system modelled after New Zealand, passport holders would no longer need to return their old passports to CIC for cancellation, but can instead apply for a new passport online while keeping the old documents before they receive the new ones. Instead of returning the old passports, applicants would be asked to cut the corners of these documents "through an honour system". The new process was expected to be available in November 2015, however the plan was cancelled in October when the use of GCMS for passport applications was temporarily suspended due to numerous security glitches in the system. IRCC permanently suspended the use of GCMS for passport applications in February 2016 following an internal audit. GCMS will not be used for passport applications until all risks, which include "Passport Program business requirements", are identified and secured.

Incidents

Misuse
Since its introduction, the Canadian passport has been a favourable target of counterfeiters, criminals and agents of foreign governments. The reasons for such high number of misuses include the relative lax issuance process before 1970, the lack of anti-counterfeit features in early non-MRP versions, and Canadian passport's high number of visa-free countries. In 2015, a fake or altered Canadian passport can cost as much as US$3,000 on the black market, almost three times higher than fake or altered EU passports.

 In 1940, Ramón Mercader, a Spanish national, travelled to Mexico City on a fraudulent Canadian passport to assassinate Leon Trotsky.
 In 1961, Konon Molody used a fraudulently obtained passport of deceased Canadian Arnold Lonsdale.  Using this identity he engaged in espionage activities in the United Kingdom.
 In 1962, three American fugitives who were convicted with narcotics-related charges obtained Canadian passports to escape to Spain. At the same time, Australian government officials also uncovered a Soviet spy ring that was using Canadian passports.
 In 1968, James Earl Ray, the man who assassinated Martin Luther King, Jr., used a Canadian passport, which was obtained with a forged baptismal certificate in the name of "Ramon George Sneyd", to temporarily escape capture following his completed assassination. He was in possession of two Canadian passports at the time of his arrest at London Heathrow Airport. Before Ray's arrest, he was able to turn his passport in, which has incorrectly spelled his fake last name as "Sneya", to the Canadian Embassy in Portugal, for a replacement under his correct alias. The arrest of Ray triggered an investigation launched by the Royal Commission on Security in 1969, which recommended much more stringent application requirements and the establishment of Passport Canada offices.
 In 1973, Mossad agents killed a waiter in Lillehammer, Norway in the mistaken belief that he was a senior operative for Black September. The use of false Canadian passports by the killers prompted a diplomatic crisis in relations between Canada and Israel, resulting in a commitment by Israel not to misuse Canadian passports in the future. It also resulted in a redesign of the Canadian passport to improve its security features.
 In 1997, Israeli secret service personnel again botched an assassination bid while using Canadian passports. The attempt against Khaled Mashal in Jordan resulted in the arrest of the would-be killers. The Foreign Affairs Minister Lloyd Axworthy eventually received an apology and a written assurance that Mossad would desist from using Canadian passports.
 Ahmed Ressam, the Algerian al-Qaeda Millennium Bomber who attempted to blow up Los Angeles International Airport on New Year's Eve 1999/2000, evaded deportation by Canada and travelled freely to and from Canada by using a Canadian passport he obtained in March 1998 by submitting a fraudulent baptismal certificate; he used a stolen blank certificate, filling it in with a fictitious name.
 In 2007, a former Canadian bureaucrat pleaded guilty to selling at least 10 fraudulent passports to individuals overseas.
 A Russian spy involved in the Illegals Program used a Canadian passport to travel to the United States to deliver payment to Russian sleeper agents.  The passport was issued to a man known as Christopher Metsos. However, following the public revelation of the spy ring in 2010, Passport Canada revoked the document, saying it had been issued by the Canadian High Commission in Johannesburg, South Africa to a man assuming the identity of a deceased Canadian child.

While not a case of misuse as it was conducted with secret approval of the Canadian government, six American diplomats were smuggled out of Iran using authentic Canadian passports containing forged Iranian visas in 1980.

Denial of passports to Abdurahman Khadr and Fateh Kamel
In July 2004, Abdurahman Khadr was denied a Canadian passport by Governor General Adrienne Clarkson on the explicit advice of her Foreign Affairs Minister, Bill Graham, who stated the decision was "in the interest of the national security of Canada and the protection of Canadian troops in Afghanistan." The government invoked Royal Prerogative in order to deny Khadr's passport, as national security was not at that time listed in the Canadian Passport Order as a ground for refusal. Shortly thereafter, on 22 September 2004, section 10.1 was added to the order, which allowed the minister to revoke or refuse a passport due to national security concerns. Khadr sought judicial review of the minister's decision to refuse his passport and, on 8 June of the following year, the Federal Court ruled that the government did not have the power to refuse to issue Khadr's passport in the absence of specific authority set out in the Canadian Passport Order, but stated in obiter dicta that if the order were to be amended, Khadr would likely not be able to challenge the revocation. In 2006, the Minister of Foreign Affairs, then Peter MacKay, again denied Khadr's application, this time invoking section 10.1 of the amended Canadian Passport Order.

Section 10.1 was later challenged in Federal Court by Fateh Kamel, whose passport had also been refused for national security reasons. On 13 March 2008, the Federal Court declared section 10.1 of the Canadian Passport Order to be unconstitutional and therefore invalid, though the court suspended its declaration of invalidity for six months in order to allow the government time to amend the order. The federal government launched an appeal at the Federal Court of Appeal and a ruling handed down on 29 January 2009 overturned the lower court decision. The court unanimously agreed the denial of passport service on national security grounds is in compliance with the Charter of Rights and Freedoms, citing the limitation clause (Section 1) as its main decision point. Kamel launched an appeal in 2009 to the Supreme Court of Canada but the court declined to hear his case and thus ended the legality challenge to the Canadian Passport Order. In 2010, Kamel attempted to re-apply for a Canadian passport but was once again refused by the minister on grounds of national security. He sought judicial review but was dismissed by the Federal Court and subsequently by the Federal Court of Appeal in 2013. Kamel did not appeal the decision of the Federal Court of Appeal to the Supreme Court of Canada.

Proof of Canadian citizenship

A Canadian passport serves as the proof of holder's identity and nationality status outside Canada. Contrary to popular belief, however, a Canadian passport itself, be it valid or invalid, is only a prima facie proof of Canadian citizenship. Conclusive proof of Canadian citizenship, as dictated by the IRCC, only includes the following documents:

Canadian citizenship certificate;
Canadian citizenship card;
Birth certificate from a Canadian province or territory;
Naturalisation certificate as a British subject in Canada (issued before 1 January 1947);
Registration of birth abroad certificate (issued between 1 January 1947 and 14 February 1977); and,
Certificates of retention (issued between 1 January 1947 and 14 February 1977)

Although the provincial or territorial birth certificate is accepted by IRCC as valid proof of citizenship, Section 3(2) of the Citizenship Act declares that a child born in Canada to a diplomatic or consular officer or other representative of a foreign country, or an employee in the service of such person, is not a Canadian citizen if neither parent was a Canadian citizen or Canadian permanent resident at time of the child's birth. Such persons may be issued Canadian passports, as their provincial or territorial birth certificate are considered as proof of citizenship. Under the Act, however, they are legally not Canadian citizens even if they hold a valid Canadian passport.

The ambiguity on the enforcement of the Act can create hardship for Canadian passport holders who assumed they were Canadian citizens. Deepan Budlakoti, a stateless man born in Ottawa to Indian parents who were employed by the Indian High Commission at the time of his birth, was twice issued a Canadian passport under the assumption that he was a Canadian citizen by virtue of being born in Canada. His Canadian passport, however, was cancelled after his criminal convictions in 2010 brought the investigation by Citizenship and Immigration Canada, which concluded in 2011 that he was not a Canadian citizen, but a permanent resident. His request for judicial review in the Federal Court, and subsequent appeals up to the Supreme Court of Canada, to recognize him as a Canadian citizen were denied. The Indian government claims that he had lost his Indian citizenship by obtaining a Canadian passport, as Rule 3 of Schedule III of the Citizenship Rules, 1956 of India states that "the fact that a citizen of India has obtained on any date a passport from the Government of any other country shall be conclusive proof of his/her having voluntarily acquired the citizenship of that country before that date". Budlakoti, therefore, is stateless, regardless of the fact that he had held a Canadian passport.

Visa requirements

Visa requirements for Canadian citizens are administrative entry restrictions by the authorities of other states placed on citizens of Canada. According to the 2022 Henley Passport Index, holders of a Canadian passport can visit 185 countries and territories without a visa or with a visa on arrival, ranking the Canadian passport 7th in the world (tied with Australia).

Visa-free access to the United States

Prior to 2007, Canadians could enter the United States by presenting a birth certificate (or other proof of Canadian citizenship) along with a form of photo identification (such as a driver's licence). In many cases United States border agents would accept a verbal declaration of citizenship.

Under the United States Western Hemisphere Travel Initiative, since 23 January 2007, all Canadians entering the United States via air have been required to present a valid passport or NEXUS card. Since 1 June 2009, the United States has required all Canadian citizens (16 years or older) to present a passport, NEXUS card, enhanced driver's licence, or Free and Secure Trade (FAST) card to enter the U.S. via land or water.

In most circumstances, Canadian citizens do not require visitor, business, transit or other visas to enter the United States, either from Canada or from other countries. Moreover, Canadian citizens are generally granted a stay in the U.S. for up to six months at the time of entry. Visa requirements only apply to Canadians who fall under visa categories, and they must apply for a visa before entry in the same manner as other nationalities:

 E (investors)
 K (fiancé(e)s or spouses and their children of U.S. citizens)
 V (spouses and children of Lawful Permanent Residents)
 S (informants)
 A (Canadian government officials travelling on official business),
 G (Canadian diplomats working for international organizations in the U.S.)
 NATO (Canadians working specifically for the NATO)
 Canadians intending to settle permanently in the United States require Immigrant Visas

Canadian students are exempted from the visa requirements if they hold a valid form I-20 or DS-2019 and have paid their SEVIS registration fees, which enables them to travel to the U.S. under F-1 or J-1 statuses.

Lawfully working in the United States

Under the United States–Mexico–Canada Agreement (USMCA), Canadian citizens can legally work in the U.S. under simplified procedure, known as TN status, if their professions are under USMCA regulations and they have a prearranged full-time or part-time job with a U.S. employer. Obtaining TN status does not involve getting a physical visa, instead the applicant is required to apply and receive TN status with U.S. Customs and Border Protection (CBP) at a U.S. port of entry. The TN status is good for three years once approved and can be renewed indefinitely if working for the same employer, however it may be reviewed and possibly revoked each time the applicant enters the U.S. TN status also does not facilitate the process of obtaining lawful U.S. permanent residency and cannot be used to live in the U.S. permanently.

Canadians who want to work in the U.S. with intention to immigrate to the U.S., or who are ineligible for TN status, can also work under the H-1B status. Unlike other nationalities, they are exempted from obtaining the physical visa from a U.S. embassy or consulate. Apart from the visa exemption, other procedures are the same with all foreign nationals.

First Nations

Under the Jay Treaty signed by the U.S. and Great Britain in 1794, all First Nations born in Canada are entitled to freely enter the U.S. for employment, education, retirement, investing, or immigration. In order to qualify, all eligible persons must provide documentation of their First Nations background at the port of entry. The documentation must be sufficient to show the bearer is "at least 50% of the American Indian race".

Foreign travel statistics

According to the statistics these are the numbers of Canadian visitors to various countries per annum in 2015 (unless otherwise noted):

See also

 Canadian Passport Order
 Canadian nationality law
 Canadian passport information on PRADO
 Visa requirements for Canadian citizens
 Visa policy of Canada
 List of diplomatic missions of Canada
Five Nations Passport Group

Notes

References

External links
 Official site
 History of Canadian Passports
 Renewal of Canadian Passports
 Passport Guarantors Policy
 Travel Advice and Advisories – Global Affairs Canada
 Directory of Canadian Government Offices Abroad – Global Affairs Canada

Canada
Passport
Passport
1862 introductions
Passport